re.present is the third major label studio album released by Jimmie's Chicken Shack, released in 2004.  The album was a departure from the light and popular punk rock sound of Bring Your Own Stereo as this album leans towards a darker sound influenced by nu metal as it was showcased in the lead single "Falling Out" which features Aaron Lewis of Staind.

Track listing

Notes
Song "Paper Dolls" was originally written by Jimi Haha and John Wozniak for Marcy Playground's 2004 album MP3. The song appeared on both bands albums.

Personnel
Jimi Haha - guitar, vocals
Derrick Dorsey - bass
Casey "Onion"/"Stacey" Hean - guitar, keyboards, backing vocals
Kevin Murphy - drums, percussion, backing vocals
Aaron Lewis - backing vocals on "Falling Out"
Art Alexakis - backing vocals on "Leech"

References

2004 albums
Jimmie's Chicken Shack albums